Garrison W. Wynn is an author, consultant, and motivational speaker. He is the author of the book The Real Truth About Success: What the Top 1% Do Differently, Why They Won't Tell You, and How You Can Do It Anyway! published by McGraw-Hill Education.

Career
Wynn has been a keynote speaker for companies and organizations such as Indiana University, SciQuest, the Southeast Mine Safety & Health Conference, TechFest 2015, Professional Dairy Producers of Wisconsin, Automotive Aftermarket Products Expo, the Midwest Multifamily Conference, the National Business Aviation Association, the MAPP Conference and many others. He speaks 90 or more times per year.

Wynn is listed by many speaker bureaus including American Program Bureau, Executive Speakers, Speak Inc, Robinson Speakers Bureau, Midwest Speaker's Bureau, Goodman Speakers Bureau, Premiere Speakers Bureau, Keppler Speakers and the Texas Speakers Bureau.

Wynn was International Corporate Fulfillment Manager for SCI from 1984 to 1990. He was a Sales Engineer with Babbitt International from 1990 to 1993.

Publications
Wynn wrote a biweekly column for the Washington Post from Nov 2009 – Dec 2010 called On Success.

He has appeared in Forbes, on ZDNET, Selling Power Magazine, The Houston Business Journal and Plastics Business Magazine.

Bibliography
The Real Truth About Success: What the Top 1% Do Differently, Why They Won't Tell You, and How You Can Do It Anyway! (2007)
Top Dog Sales Secrets: 50 Top Experts Show You Proven Ways to Skyrocket Your Sales (2007)
The Cowbell Principle: Career Advice On How To Get Your Dream Job And Make More Money (2014)

References

External links
 
Digital Leadership Speaker

Living people
1961 births
American motivational speakers
American business writers